The Celina City School District is a public school district in Mercer County, Ohio, United States, based in Celina, Ohio.

Schools
The Celina City School District has two elementary schools, one intermediate school, one middle school, and one high school.

Elementary schools 
Celina Elementary School
Celina Primary School

Middle school
Celina Middle School

Intermediate school
Celina Intermediate School

High school
Celina High School

References

External links
 

School districts in Ohio
School District